The November Nine was the name used to refer to the final nine contestants, or final table, at the Main Event of the World Series of Poker (WSOP) from 2008 to 2016. The winner of the WSOP Main Event is considered to be the World Champion of Poker.
  
Prior to 2008, the entire Main Event was played without interruption. Starting in 2008, in an effort to build excitement in the WSOP and to increase ratings for the tape-delayed televised shows, Harrah's Entertainment and ESPN decided to delay the final table until shortly before its scheduled broadcast.  The delay would allow ESPN to cover the rest of the tournament leading up to the final table without viewers knowing the winner in advance.  Due to the timing of U.S. presidential elections, the final tables for the 2012 and 2016 Main Events were held in October.

In 2017, Poker Central announced a television and digital media rights agreement with the WSOP and ESPN which returned the final table to the tail end of the rest of the tournament.

Reception and criticism
After the announcement was made to delay the final table, concerns arose as to how the delay would affect the tournament.  Ylon Schwartz, a 2008 November Nine participant, criticized the four-month delay by saying, "It ruins the integrity of the tournament. The purity of old-time Las Vegas is gone. The antiquity and purity of the tournament have been liquidated into pure greed and capitalism."  ESPN's Senior Director of Programming and Acquisition, Doug White, stated, "The movement of the final table has definitely helped in terms of creating buzz."

When the 2008 November Nine was broadcast "almost live," ESPN received criticism because the network showed the winner's name prior to the broadcast.  Poker journalist Dan Skolovy wrote, "It turned out to be a difficult task to avoid hearing the results. Especially since... ESPN scrolled the winner on its sports ticker long before the broadcast aired."  Nonetheless, coverage of the 2008 final table garnered more than a 50 percent increase from the previous year in both the number of viewers and households that watched it. The broadcast later received an Emmy Award nomination for "Outstanding Live Event Turnaround."

Results

2008

Original field: 6,844

Total prize pool: $64,431,779

Final table minimum prize: $900,670

Final table maximum prize: $9,152,416

Final table total prize pool: $32,633,446

Reference:

Dennis Phillips was an account manager for a commercial trucking company. Peter Eastgate, from Denmark, was one of only two non-North American players to make it to the final table (Russian Ivan Demidov was the other). By making the final table, Eastgate and 23-year-old Craig Marquis threatened Phil Hellmuth's 19-year record as youngest person to ever win the WSOP Main Event; Eastgate's victory gave him that distinction. Ylon Schwartz was a former professional chess hustler in New York City parks.  Two players, accountant Darus Suharto and poker professional Scott Montgomery, were originally from Canada.  Kelly Kim, who had the fewest chips entering the final table, was an established professional player who cashed in numerous events but never won a major tournament.

2009

Original field: 6,494

Total prize pool: $61,043,600

Final table minimum prize: $1,263,602

Final table maximum prize: $8,547,042

Final table total prize pool: $27,220,989

Reference:

The final table's "rags to riches" story was Darvin Moon, a logger from Maryland. Moon entered the Main Event after winning a $130 satellite tournament in Wheeling, West Virginia.

Jeff Shulman, who entered the final table in fourth place, was the president for Card Player Magazine.  Shulman openly stated that, if he won the bracelet, he would throw it away. Some initially speculated that this announcement stemmed from the fact that Harrah's Casino had partnered with Card Player Magazine's main competitor, Bluff Magazine.  However, an article on the Card Player website indicated that Shulman's supposed disdain for Harrah's Casino was not based on its partnership with Bluff Magazine.  “My comments have nothing to do with that, and everything to do with my disappointment in how the World Series is run," said Shulman. "It used to be run by people who loved and really cared about poker, and had the players in mind, first and foremost. That mission's been derailed by a few executives who now head the Series."  He also indicated that, if he won the bracelet, he would not throw it in the trash, but instead would pursue one of four options: hold an auction and donate the money to charity, hold a tournament for the players shut out of the 2009 WSOP Main Event, give it away as part of a promotion on SpadeClub.com (an online poker site sponsored by Cardplayer), or give it to television personality Stephen Colbert.

Other notable finalists included seven-time bracelet winner Phil Ivey and former Bear Stearns senior executive Steven Begleiter.

At age 21, Joe Cada became the youngest player ever to win the WSOP Main Event.

2010

Original field: 7,319

Total prize pool: $68,798,600

Final table minimum prize: $811,823

Final table maximum prize: $8,944,310

Final table prize pool: $29,032,637

Jonathan Duhamel wins the tournament with the lead in chips at the final table.

2011

Original field: 6,865

Total prize Pool: $64,531,000

Final table minimum prize: $782,115

Final table maximum prize: $8,715,638

Final table prize pool: $28,469,161

Eoghan O'Dea's father, Donnacha O'Dea, played the Main Event final table in 1983 and 1991, making them the first father-son duo to make the final table. Martin Staszko, Badih Bounahra and Anton Makiievskyi were the first players to make the final table from their respective countries: Czech Republic, Belize and Ukraine.  With seven different countries represented, this was the most internationally diverse Main Event final table in WSOP history.

2012

Original field: 6,598

Total prize Pool: $62,021,200

Final table minimum prize: $754,798

Final table maximum prize: $8,527,982

Final table prize pool: $27,247,840

2013

Original field: 6,352

Total prize Pool: $59,708,800

Final table minimum prize: $733,224

Final table maximum prize: $8,359,531

Final table prize pool: $26,662,066

2014

Original field: 6,683

Total prize Pool: $62,820,200

Final table minimum prize: $730,725

Final table maximum prize: $10,000,000

Final table prize pool: $28,480,121

Mark Newhouse became the first player to make two consecutive Main Event final tables since Dan Harrington in 2003 and 2004. Bruno Politano became the first Main Event finalist from Brazil. This is the second final table since the format change in 2008 that none of the players had previously won a bracelet.

2015

Original field: 6,420

Total prize Pool: $60,348,000

Final table minimum prize: $1,001,020

Final table maximum prize: $7,683,346

Final table prize pool: $24,799,118

Joe McKeehen is the second player to start with the chip lead at the final table and win.

2016

Original field: 6,737

Total prize Pool: $63,327,800

Final table minimum prize: $1,000,000

Final table maximum prize: $8,000,000

Final table prize pool: $25,432,920

Notes
 The number of bracelets, cashes, and earnings of the players is determined at the time they qualified for the final table of the Main Event.  It does not represent any results from subsequent WSOP events including the World Series of Poker Europe, which occurs between the time the final table is determined and subsequently seated.

References

World Series of Poker
Sports competitions in Las Vegas
Television shows about poker